10/5 may refer to:
October 5 (month-day date notation)
May 10 (day-month date notation)
10 shillings and 5 pence in UK predecimal currency

See also
105 (disambiguation)
5/10 (disambiguation)